Jennifer Leigh Hammon (born March 7, 1976) is an American-born actress known for her work on the daytime soap opera Port Charles (1997–99) and as the lead in the 1997 film Allyson Is Watching.

Biography 
Jennifer Hammon was born in Orlando, Florida and attended Winter Park High School in the early 1990s and was a member of International Thespian Society Troupe 850 (other notable alums include Amanda Bearse, Billy Gardell, and Ben Rock from The Blair Witch Project).  She graduated from Florida State University with a degree in Fine Art , and while a student acted in many theatrical productions.

At the age of 15, she was cast as a cheerleader in cable's Super Force. Other television credits include the CBS daytime soap opera The Young and the Restless, and in the television movie, Killing Mr. Griffin.

Hammon studied acting at the Beverly Hills Playhouse. She was first noticed when she accepted the role of Dr. Karen Wexler Cates on the daytime soap opera Port Charles from June 1997 to 1999. When Hammon declined a contract in 1999, the role was recast, with Marie Wilson assuming the role.

Hammon's theatrical credits include Parenthood, The Bodyguard and Wilder Napalm.

Filmography

Films
Allyson Is Watching (1997) (as Jennifer Leigh Hammon) as Allyson Roper
Artie (2000) as Kristen
Mach 2 (2001) as Gina Kendall

Television
Killing Mr. Griffin (1997) (TV movie) as Bree Gunderson
General Hospital (1997, 1999) as Karen Wexler Cates
Port Charles (1997–99) as Karen Wexler Cates
JAG ("Drop Zone") (2000) as Krista Barron
Star Trek: Voyager ("Author, Author") (2001) as  Female N.D.

References

External links

American soap opera actresses
American television actresses
Actresses from Orlando, Florida
Living people
1976 births
21st-century American women